is a Japanese comedian, singer, YouTuber, and kannushi. As a lyricist and composer of 50TA, he is nicknamed . He graduated from the Japan Institute of the Moving Image. He completed his kannushi training in Kokugakuin University. He was a former kyūdōka at the National Sports Festival of Japan.

Filmography

TV series

Current appearances
Regular appearances

Quasi-regular appearances

Special appearances

Former appearances
Regular appearances

Quasi-regular appearances

Special appearances

Nationwide programmes
NHK

Nippon TV

Tokyo Broadcasting System

Fuji Television

TV Asahi

TV Tokyo

Local programmes
Chubu-Nippon Broadcasting

Tōkai Television Broadcasting

Sapporo Television Broadcasting

Satellite programmes

Radio

Internet

Advertisements

Anime, drama

Films

Video games

Solo shows

Discography

Singles

Participation

DVD

As 50TA

Best albums

References

External links
 
 
 

Japanese comedians
Japanese male singers
Japanese male actors
Universal Music Japan artists
Kannushi
1982 births
Living people
People from Miyagi Prefecture
Japanese YouTubers